The Associated State of Antigua competed in the Olympic Games for the first time at the 1976 Summer Olympics in Montreal, Quebec, Canada. Ten competitors, all men, took part in eleven events in two sports.

Athletics

Men
Track & road events

Field events

Cycling

Two cyclists represented Antigua and Barbuda in 1976.

Track

1000m time trial

Men's Sprint

Pursuit

See also
Antigua and Barbuda at the 1979 Pan American Games

References

External links
Official Olympic Reports

Nations at the 1976 Summer Olympics
1976
Olympics